The Khyber Border Coordination Center is a joint military intelligence center located near Torkham, Afghanistan.  The purpose of the facility is to facilitate the sharing of information between Afghanistan, Pakistan, the International Security Assistance Force, and NATO government and military personnel in their war on Taliban forces in the Khyber Pass area.  The center, managed primarily by the United States was officially opened on March 29, 2008 and became operational in July 2008.  The center is the first of six scheduled to open along the Afghanistan-Pakistan border.

References

Military installations of Afghanistan
Wars involving Pakistan
Military installations of NATO
Military units and formations of the War in Afghanistan (2001–2021)
Military installations of the United States in Afghanistan